Lucas Mazur (born 18 November 1997) is a French para-badminton player who competes in international level events.

Achievements

Paralympic Games 
Men's singles

Mixed doubles

World Championships 

Men's singles

Mixed doubles

European Championships 
Men's singles

Men's doubles

Mixed doubles

BWF Para Badminton World Circuit (3 titles) 
The BWF Para Badminton World Circuit – Grade 2, Level 1, 2 and 3 tournaments has been sanctioned by the Badminton World Federation from 2022.

Men's singles

Mixed doubles

International Tournaments (30 titles, 20 runners-up) 
Men's singles

Men's doubles

Doubles

Mixed doubles

References

External links
 
 

1997 births
Living people
Sportspeople from Bourges
French male badminton players
French para-badminton players
Paralympic badminton players of France
Badminton players at the 2020 Summer Paralympics
Paralympic medalists in badminton
Medalists at the 2020 Summer Paralympics
Paralympic gold medalists for France
Paralympic silver medalists for France
Sportspeople from Cher (department)
21st-century French people